In Africa, the little five game animals are:
Elephant shrew: a small, insect-eating mammal with a long nose. Elephant shrews are very common in Southern Africa but seldom seen. 
Buffalo weaver: the buffalo weaver is the easiest among the little five to find and observe.
Leopard tortoise
Antlion, which is the littlest of the little five. 
Rhino beetle: A subfamily of large beetles in the scarab beetle family.

The term little five was brought to life after the marketing success of the big five for tourist safaris in Southern Africa. This prompted a call by nature conservationists for visitors to acknowledge the smaller, less noticed, but still enigmatic animals of the savanna (called bushveld in South Africa).

The "little five" species are a contrast in terms of sheer relative size to the animals which they share a part of their English name with the more well known "big five".

See also
 Impossible five

References

Sources 

Wildlife
Tourism in South Africa
5 (number)